Ilkka Tapani Mesikämmen (born 15 March 1943 in Turku, Finland) is a retired professional ice hockey player who played in the SM-liiga.  He played for Ässät and TPS. He competed in the men's tournament at the 1964 Winter Olympics. He was inducted into the Finnish Hockey Hall of Fame in 1988.

References

External links
 Finnish Hockey Hall of Fame bio

1943 births
Ässät players
Finnish ice hockey players
Living people
Sportspeople from Turku
HC TPS players
Olympic ice hockey players of Finland
Ice hockey players at the 1964 Winter Olympics